Cop is the second studio album by American experimental rock band Swans. It was released in 1984, through record label K.422.

Background and composition

On Cop, Swans took the style of their previous LP, 1983's Filth, and intensified it, utilizing slower tempos, more tape loops, and even more abrasive musical textures. The lyrics are again concerned with ambiguous themes like physical, often sexual domination and occasionally submission. Some publications recognize Cop as Swans' darkest, most brutal release.

Release

In 1984, Cop was released through K.422 as Swans' second album. Initially, the album was only available as an LP. Throughout the band's history, though, Cop has been reissued within a number of different compilations. It was remastered by Michael Gira in 1992 for release on CD along with the Young God EP (1984) appended as bonus tracks. The 1999 double disc reissue Cop/Young God / Greed/Holy Money combines Cop and Young God with the compilation Greed/Holy Money (itself compiled from the albums Greed (1986) and Holy Money (1986)). The packaging for all issues states that the recording is "designed to be played at maximum volume".

Critical reception

AllMusic critic Ned Raggett wrote of the album, "Ugly, compelling and overpowering, Cop remains the pinnacle of Swans' brutal early days", calling it "quite possibly one of the darkest recordings ever done." Later writing for The Quietus, Raggett continued praising Cop, recognizing it as the source of other bands like Godflesh and The Young Gods. Aaron Lariviere of Stereogum added Neurosis to the list of bands that Cop helped influence. Miranda Yardley of Terrorizer wrote, "Michael Gira and co. make music that generates its own gravity well, never more so than here." Jonathan Gold of the Los Angeles Times listed Cop as one of the ten most essential industrial albums.

Accolades

Track listing

Personnel 
Swans
 Michael Gira – vocals, tapes, production
 Harry Crosby – bass guitar
 Norman Westberg – guitar
 Roli Mosimann – drums, production

Additional personnel
 Lee Ranaldo – sleeve back cover photography
 Jonathan Thayer – engineering
 JG Thirlwell – engineering
 Mark Berry – engineering
 Harry Lombardy – engineering
 Voco – engineering

Charts

References 

Swans (band) albums
1984 albums
Noise rock albums by American artists
No wave albums
Albums produced by Michael Gira
Albums produced by Roli Mosimann